Charlie Richard Cresswell (born 17 August 2002) is an English professional footballer who plays as a centre-back for Millwall on loan from  club Leeds United.

Club career

Leeds United
Cresswell was born in Preston, but grew up in York. He started his career at Leeds United in 2013, before signing a two-year scholarship with the club in 2018. He was included in the League Football Education's The 11 award for under-18 players in June 2019, and signed his first professional contract with the club in September 2019.

He made his debut for Leeds on 16 September 2020 against Hull City in the EFL Cup. Cresswell extended his contract to summer 2023 on 19 November 2020. Cresswell captained the under-23s to the Premier League 2 Division 2 title and was nominated along with team mate Sam Greenwood for the Premier League 2 Player of the Season award. Cresswell made his Premier League debut for Leeds United on 25 September 2021 in the starting line-up for the 2–1 defeat against West Ham United at Elland Road.

Millwall (loan)
On 4 July 2022, Cresswell signed for EFL Championship club Millwall on a season-long loan deal. He scored two goals on his debut as Millwall beat Stoke City 2–0 in the first game of the season on 30 July.

International career
On 2 October 2020, Cresswell was named in the England under-19 squad. He made his debut for the under-19s in a friendly match versus Scotland at St George's Park, scoring in the first half as England went into half-time with a 3–1 lead. However, the game was abandoned during the interval after a member of the coaching staff tested positive for COVID-19.

On 27 August 2021, Cresswell received his first call up for the England Under 21 squad. He made his debut for the side as a substitute in a 3–1 win over the Czech Republic on 11 November 2021.

Personal life
He is the son of former professional footballer Richard Cresswell, who played for Leeds United in the early 2000s and after retiring was part of the Leeds United academy coaching staff.

Career statistics

References

External links
 
 

2002 births
Living people
English footballers
Footballers from Preston, Lancashire
Association football defenders
Leeds United F.C. players
Millwall F.C. players
Premier League players
England under-21 international footballers
English Football League players